McEnroe is an Irish surname. Notable people with the surname include:

Colin McEnroe (born 1954), American columnist and radio personality
John McEnroe (born 1959), American former professional tennis player
Patrick McEnroe (born 1966), American broadcaster and former professional tennis player
Robert E. McEnroe (1916–1998), American playwright

Surnames of Irish origin